Sloppy Jane is an American chamber pop /  rock music band fronted by Haley Dahl based in Brooklyn, New York. The band released their breakthrough second studio album Madison in 2021, through Saddest Factory Records, an imprint owned by their former bassist Phoebe Bridgers. Dahl is known for her eccentric performance art style which used to include nudity.

Career
Early Career (2009-2015)

Haley Dahl was born in 1995 in New York City and raised in Los Angeles. It was in the latter city that she formed Sloppy Jane at the age of fifteen, performing up and down the Sunset Strip. As an experiment she wore one suit for an entire year without washing it, vowing to wear it until it "rots off her body" and now intends to eat it.

In 2014, Sloppy Jane released two demos Totally Limbless and Burger Radio with the line-up of Haley Dahl on lead vocals and guitar, Phoebe Bridgers on bass and background vocals, and Imogen Teasley-Vlautin on drums. They released their debut extended play Sure-Tuff on July 14, 2015 through Lolipop Records. This release saw the addition of Sara Catherine on guitar. Sure-Tuff was inspired by both post-punk and proto-punk music.

Willow (2017-2019)

Their debut studio album Willow was self-released on March 23, 2018. For this album Sloppy Jane was a duo, with Dahl performing vocals, guitar, piano, and bass, and Sara Catherine playing drums as well as additional guitar and vocals. This album was recorded in Los Angeles. Willow also featured non-members Charlene Huang and April Guthrie on violin and cello respectively. Musically, it is an art rock and punk rock album that "reflected a shift toward more playful, theatrical songs involving instruments like glockenspiel and flexatone, spoken word samples, and crowd noise". Following its release, Dahl moved back to her hometown of New York City.

Madison (2020-Present)

On September 9, 2021 Sloppy Jane signed to the band's former bassist Phoebe Bridgers' Saddest Factory Records. Their second studio album Madison was released on November 5 of the same year. 

Starting in 2017 Dahl had ambitions of recording in a cave. Because of this, she started spelunking in 2019, looking for a cave that had the right acoustics and would be willing to let her record. The album was set to record in late 2019, this was however delayed when Dahl was attacked walking to her apartment in Brooklyn on September 10, 2019, leaving her with cuts and stitches. The recording of the album finally began in the spring of 2020. 

Madison had two release shows where the album was played in full. One in Brooklyn on November 7, 2021 and one in Los Angeles on December 3, 2021. Following these performances the band opened for Iceage in February and March 2022. 
The band then went on to play SXSW on March 16 for the saddestfactory showcase and then after opened for a few shows on Phoebe Bridgers’ tour in May. 
Sloppy Jane then went on their Madison Tour October and November 2022. These shows were black tie required. 

For the one year anniversary of Madison the band released the 7” vinyl “My Misery Will Bury You” featuring two versions of “Wilt”, the Madison version and a cover done by Phoebe Bridgers in 2015. 

Following the year of touring, Dahl moved to Cerro Gordo, an abandoned mining town in the Owens Valley near Lone Pine, California. Dahl, along with other members of the mining town project, have ambitions of building a recording studio in the town for musicians to use.

Members

Rotating live members

Haley Dahl – lead vocals, guitar, piano, bass 
Al Nardo – guitar, glockenspiel, drums, vocals 
Bailey Wollowitz – drums, trumpet, synths, percussion, guitar, vocals  
Lily Rothman – keyboards, flute, guitar, vocals 
Lily Desmond – violin, vocals 
Ruby Wang - violin 
Sean Brennan – cello 
Nicolette Miller – vocals 
Nathan Lopez – guitar, glockenspiel  
Jackie Cohen – vocals 
Abby Lim-Kimberg – harp, vocals 
Isabella Bustanoby - viola, bass, vocals 
Raina Bock – bass 
Fern Perera – violin 
Khalil Long - trumpet

Past members
Emma Stacher – bass, vocals 
Noor Al-Samarrai - background vocals 
Avishag Cohen-Rodriguez – guitar 
Joseph Sutkwoski – guitar 
Jack Wetmore – bass  , guitar 
Tamar Jusidman - background vocals 
Katie Vreeland – bass 
Phoebe Bridgers – bass, background vocals 
Imogen Teasley-Vlautin – drums, background vocals 
Sara Catherine – guitar, drums, guitar,  background vocals 
Ember Knight – bass, background vocals

Discography

Studio albums

Demo albums

Extended plays

Singles

Music videos

References

Avant-garde music groups
Chamber pop musicians
Dead Oceans artists
Experimental rock groups
Musical groups established in 2009
Musical groups from Los Angeles
American post-punk music groups
Punk rock groups from California